Celaenorrhinus ruficornis, commonly known as the Tamil spotted flat, is a species of butterfly belonging to the family Hesperiidae which is found in India, Java, and the Sulawesi Region.

Range
The subspecies, Celaenorrhinus ruficornis fusca Hampson, 1889 occurs in India in the Western Ghats, Nilgiris and the Palni hills.

A record in Calcutta may be vagrant or mistaken.

Description

The butterfly has a wingspan of 45 to 50 mm. The butterflies resemble the common spotted flat except that the discal spot in 2 and the spot end cell of the forewing are separate. The upper hindwing is only obscurely marked. The antenna is chequered and has a white club.

Habits
It is common along the Western Ghats, especially during the monsoon. It may be caught in the daytime by beating out roadside patches of Lantana camara.

Life history
Food plants: Phaulopsis, Strobilanthes (Acanthaceae).

Cited references

See also
Hesperiidae
List of butterflies of India (Hesperiidae)

References
Print

Online
Brower, Andrew V. Z., (2007). Celaenorrhinus Hübner 1819. Ancistrocampta C. Felder & R. Felder 1862 currently viewed as a subjective junior synonym. Version 4 March 2007 (under construction). http://tolweb.org/Celaenorrhinus/95353/2007.03.04 in The Tree of Life Web Project, http://tolweb.org/.

rutilans
Butterflies of Asia